Anita Anderberg Madsen (born 31 May 1995) is a Danish former competitive figure skater. She is a two-time Danish national champion, won three senior international medals, and placed 16th at the 2013 European Championships.

In November 2014, Madsen retired from competitive figure skating.

Programs

Competitive highlights 
JGP: Junior Grand Prix

References

External links 

 
 Official website

1995 births
Danish female single skaters
Living people
People from Glostrup Municipality
Sportspeople from the Capital Region of Denmark